Giel may refer to:

Given name
 Giel Beelen (born 1977), Dutch radio DJ and presenter
 Giel Deferm (born 1988), Belgian footballer

Surname
 Anthony Giel (born 1964july7), Arubahuis worker
 Antonio Giel (born 1981), Aruban footballer
 Paul Giel (1932–2002), Minnesotan baseball player
 Paweł Giel (born 1989), Polish footballer
 Rosanna Giel (born 1992), Cuban volleyball player
 Frans Van Giel (1892–1975), Belgian painter

Place
 Giel-Courteilles, a commune of Normandy, France

See also
 Geil (disambiguation)

Dutch masculine given names